Vonones I ( Onōnēs on his coins) was an Arsacid prince, who ruled as King of Kings of Parthian Empire from 8 to 12, and then subsequently as king of Armenia from 12 to 18. He was the eldest son of Phraates IV and was sent to Rome as a hostage in 10/9 BC in order to prevent conflict over the succession of Phraates IV's youngest son, Phraataces.

Background and early life 
Vonones was the eldest son of Phraates IV. According to the classical Roman historian Tacitus, Vonones was related to the Scythian king. Vonones was along with three of his brothers (Phraates, Seraspandes and Rhodaspes) sent to Rome in 10/9 BC, in order to prevent conflict over the succession of Phraates IV's youngest son, Phraataces. The Roman emperor Augustus used this as propaganda depicting the submission of Parthia to Rome, listing it as a great accomplishment in his Res Gestae Divi Augusti.

Reign 
After the assassination of Orodes III in about 6 AD, the Parthians applied to Augustus for a new king from the house of Arsaces. Augustus sent them Vonones I, but he could not maintain himself as king; he had been educated as a Roman, and was despised by the Parthian nobility as a Roman stooge. Another member of the Arsacid house, Artabanus II, who ruled Media Atropatene, was invited to the throne. In a civil war he defeated and expelled Vonones I.

Vonones I fled into Armenia and became king there in 12. Artabanus II, now the monarch of the Parthian Empire, attempted to depose Vonones I from the Armenian throne and appoint his own son instead. This was opposed by the Romans, who regarded this as posing a danger to their interests. As a result, the Roman emperor Tiberius sent his stepson Germanicus to prevent this from happening. However, the Roman general was met with no resistance by the Parthians, and reached an agreement with Artabanus II to appoint Artaxias III the new King of Armenia and renounce their support of Vonones I. The Romans thus acknowledged Artabanus II as the legitimate Parthian ruler. In order to ratify the friendly relationship between the two empires, Artabanus and Germanicus met on an island in the Euphrates in 18. The Romans moved Vonones I into Syria, where he was kept in custody, though in a kingly style. Later he was moved to Cilicia, and when he tried to escape in about 19, he was killed by his guards.

His death and the now unchallenged dominance of Artabanus II split the Parthian nobility, since not all of them supported a new branch of the Arsacid family taking over the empire. The Parthian satrap of Sakastan, Drangiana and Arachosia, named Gondophares, declared independence from Artabanus II and founded the Indo-Parthian Kingdom. He assumed the titles of "Great King of Kings" and "Autokrator", demonstrating his new-found independence. Nevertheless, Artabanus and Gondophares most likely reached an agreement that the Indo-Parthians would not intervene in the affairs of the Arsacids. Vonones was survived by his son Meherdates, who attempted to take the Parthian throne in 49–51.

References

Bibliography

Ancient works 
 Hon. Ana. 5, 9.
 Josephus, Antiquities of the Jews, xviii, 2, 4.
 Tacitus, Annals, ii, 4, 58, 68.

Modern works 
 
 
 
 
 
 
  
 
 
 

1st-century BC births
19 deaths
1st-century kings of Armenia
1st-century Parthian monarchs
Roman client kings of Armenia
1st-century Iranian people
1st-century Babylonian kings